Podsafe Music Network (PMN) was the primary archive of podsafe music (music available for use in podcasting without significant licensing difficulties) on the internet. It was established by Mevio, a podcast production company founded by Adam Curry and Ron Bloom, in the summer of 2005. The network's website provided tools for musicians and for podcasters, and also made streamed music available to the casual listener.

The network was built by Chris Rockwell Breshears of the podcast The Daily Download and designed by Sue Fleming with the help of C.C. Chapman.

The network and Mevio sought to promote the work of artists, independent and signed alike, who embraced the podcasting idea and made their work available for broadcast and promotion by podcasters.

See also
 Creative Commons

References

Podcasting companies
Internet properties established in 2005
Internet properties disestablished in 2014